The men's sprint was held on 24 February 2011. Sprint qualifying at 13:00 CET with finals at 15:00 CET. The defending world champion was Norway's Ola Vigen Hattestad while the defending Olympic champion was Russia's Nikita Kriukov.

Results

Qualification

Quarterfinals

Quarterfinal 1

Quarterfinal 2

Quarterfinal 3

Quarterfinal 4

Quarterfinal 5

Semifinals

Semifinal 1

Semifinal 2

Finals

See also
2011 IPC Biathlon and Cross-Country Skiing World Championships – Men's sprint

References

External links
Qualification
Results

FIS Nordic World Ski Championships 2011